These are the official results of the Men's 110 metres hurdles event at the 1986 European Championships in Stuttgart, West Germany, held at Neckarstadion on 28, 29, and 30 August 1986.

Medalists

Results

Final
30 August
Wind: 2.0 m/s

Semi-finals
29 August

Semi-final 1
Wind: 0.9 m/s

Semi-final 2
Wind: 0.7 m/s

Heats
28 August

Heat 1
Wind: 0.0 m/s

Heat 2
Wind: -0.9 m/s

Heat 3
Wind: -1.0 m/s

Heat 4
Wind: -1.0 m/s

Participation
According to an unofficial count, 25 athletes from 17 countries participated in the event.

 (2)
 (1)
 (1)
 (1)
 (2)
 (2)
 (1)
 (2)
 (1)
 (1)
 (1)
 (1)
 (3)
 (1)
 (2)
 (2)
 (1)

References

External links
Results

Hurdles 110
Sprint hurdles at the European Athletics Championships